The 1968–69 NBA season was the Royals 21st season in the NBA and 12th season in Cincinnati.
The season was noteworthy for the team's fast start, in which the team was 15–6 by the end of November. But the team faded in the second half, failing to make the playoff cut in the tough Eastern Division.

Roster

Regular season
The regular season opened on the road October 16, 1968 against the brand-new Atlanta Hawks, which had just relocated from St. Louis. The Royals won 125–110 behind a balanced attack featuring a rotation of stars Oscar Robertson, Connie Dierking, Jerry Lucas, Adrian Smith, John Tresvant, Tom Van Arsdale and Walt Wesley.  The Royals won their first three straight, including their home opener over Detroit on October 19 at Cincinnati Gardens arena.
After a pair of losses, Cincinnati won their next six straight, bringing their record to a 9–2 start by November 12. Their 126–115 win over the 10-4 Baltimore Bullets that day gave them the best record in the league.
The team went evenly through wins and losses before winning six more in a row in early December, bringing their record to 20–9 by December 15. Two wins in the team's second home, Cleveland Arena, were part of that streak. The December 15th win was another  ' road ' home game played in Omaha, Nebraska, a site favored by team General Manager Joel Axelson. The win on the 15th put them in a tie for third-best record in the NBA with the Boston Celtics at 20–9, just behind Baltimore and the Philadelphia 76ers. It also prompted a Sports Illustrated article in their 12/09/1968 issue, ' Serious Contenders In A Funny City ', written by Frank Deford, which left-handedly praised the team, and harshly criticized the city's sports fans and management.
The team soon faded after the article, going 21–32 the rest of the season to finish fifth in the East at .500, out of the 1969 NBA playoffs. Their record was better than the 37–45 mark of the Western Division San Diego Rockets, who did make those playoffs.

Season standings

Record vs. opponents

x – clinched playoff spot

Game log

Player statistics

 There was no 3-point line in use this season, blocks and steals were not yet kept NBA statistics.

Awards and records
 Oscar Robertson, All-NBA First Team
 Robertson and Jerry Lucas were each named starters to the Eastern squad for the 1969 NBA All-Star Game. Tom Van Arsdale would make the All Star Team the following season.

Transactions
 February 1, 1969 :  starter John Tresvant was traded to Seattle for Al Tucker.

References

 http://www.basketball-reference.com/teams/CIN/1969.html

Cincinnati
Sacramento Kings seasons
Cincinnati
Cincinnati